HMS Oxford was a 54-gun fourth-rate ship of the line of the Royal Navy, built by Francis Baylie in Bristol and launched in June 1674. Her guns comprised twenty-two 24-pounders on the lower deck, with twenty-two large sakers (8-pounders) on the upper deck and ten smaller sakers (5-pounders) on the quarter deck.

On 23 February 1684, Captain John Tyrrell was appointed to command the ship. In 1692 she was at the Battle of Barfleur under the command of Captain James Wishart. From 1701 to 1702 Oxford underwent a Great Repair amounting to rebuilding at Deptford.

On 29 June 1723 she was ordered to be taken to pieces at Portsmouth Dockyard, and rebuilt by Joseph Allin the younger to the lines of a 50-gun fourth rate of the 1719 Establishment. She relaunched on 10 July 1727.

Towards the end of the Seven Years' War the ship was commanded by Mariot Arbuthnot.

Oxford was broken up in 1758.

Notes

References

Lavery, Brian (2003) The Ship of the Line - Volume 1: The development of the battlefleet 1650-1850. Conway Maritime Press. .
Michael Phillips. Oxford (54) (1674). Michael Phillips' Ships of the Old Navy. Retrieved 10 December 2007.

Ships of the line of the Royal Navy
1670s ships